Mark James William Wright (born 1 February 1981) is a cricketer who represents the Hong Kong national team.  Wright is a right-handed batsman who bowls right-arm off break.  He was born in Edmonton, London.

Wright represented the Middlesex Cricket Board in a single List A match against Berkshire in the 2001 Cheltenham & Gloucester Trophy.  In his only List A match he scored 5 runs and with the ball he took a single wicket at a cost of 13 runs.

In 2005, he played his only Minor Counties Championship match for Buckinghamshire against Cumberland.  The following season he made his debut for the county in the MCCA Knockout Trophy against Cambridgeshire.  Two years later, he played his second and final Trophy match for the county against Dorset.

In 2009, he represented Hong Kong in the 2009 Hong Kong Cricket Sixes, playing matches against South Africa, New Zealand, England and Sri Lanka.  Being 5 overs per innings matches, these games therefore held no official status. He also represented Hong Kong in official List A matches at the 2014 World Cup Qualifier.

References

External links
Mark Wright at Cricinfo
Mark Wright at CricketArchive

1981 births
Living people
People from Edmonton, London
Cricketers from Greater London
English cricketers
Middlesex Cricket Board cricketers
Buckinghamshire cricketers
English expatriate sportspeople in Hong Kong
Hong Kong cricketers